The Madamango sea catfish (Cathorops spixii), also known as the Raspfin sea catfish or the Spring cuirass, is a species of catfish in the family Ariidae. It was described by Louis Agassiz in 1829. It is a tropical, marine and brackish water-dwelling catfish which occurs between Colombia and Brazil.

The Madamango sea catfish feeds on a variety of crustaceans, including amphipods, copepods, isopods; as well as bony fish and benthic invertebrates. It is preyed upon by Arius parkeri and Elops saurus. It is marketed commercially.

The species epithet refers to biologist Johann Baptist von Spix.

References

Ariidae
Fish described in 1829
Taxa_named_by_Louis_Agassiz